Circuit des Ardennes is a French cycling road race held annually in the month of April in Charleville-Mézières and the surrounding mountainous  region of the Ardennes. It is rated 2.2 on UCI Europe Tour.

The race has in the past highlighted developing talent, including Stephen Roche and Greg LeMond.

Past winners

References

External links
 Results
 Circuit des Ardennes

Recurring sporting events established in 1930
1930 establishments in France
Cycle races in France
UCI Europe Tour races